Für die Nacht gemacht is the second full-length album of Mondsucht.

Track listing
"Abenddämmerung"– 2:45
"Tiefenstille"– 4:10
"Zwei Wege"– 4:13
"Schwarzes Herz"– 4:23
"Die Zeit"– 4:15
"Keine Träume"– 3:32
"Mitten in der Nacht"– 4:14
"Zeig mir Dein Gesicht"– 3:53
"Alles für Dich"– 4:40
"Nachtfalter"- 4:45
"Morgengrauen"– 5:53

Info
 All tracks written and produced by Mondsucht
 Male vocals by Robert N.
 Female vocals by Astrid M.

External links
 Mondsucht Discography Info

2002 albums
Mondsucht albums
Alice In... albums